Samsung Ultra Edition is a former series of mobile phones from Samsung Electronics that were designed to be extremely slim and minimalistic. The first range was introduced in June 2006 which included the X820, dubbed the "world's thinnest" at just 6.9 millimetres thickness. The second range came in February 2007 including the new "world's thinnest" U100 model at 5.9 mm thickness, a figure that remains very rare in handsets as of 2020. To date, the slimmest mobile phones are Oppo R5 and R5s introduced 2014 with 4.9 mm thickness. The "Ultra Edition" names represent the respective handset's width in millimetres.

List of devices
Ultra Edition
Samsung D830 (Ultra Edition 9.9)
Samsung D900 (Ultra Edition 12.9)
Samsung X820 (Ultra Edition 6.9)
Samsung Z720 (Ultra Edition 13.8)

Ultra Edition II
Samsung U100 (Ultra Edition 5.9)
Samsung U300 (Ultra Edition 9.6)
Samsung U600 (Ultra Edition 10.9)
Samsung U700 (Ultra Edition 12.1)

References

See also
Motorola RAZR V3
Motorola SLVR
Samsung U900 Soul

Ultra